Austria sent a delegation to the 2008 Summer Paralympics in Beijing, and unsuccessfully tried to improve on the 23 medals (8 of them gold) won in 2004. 38 Austrian athletes competed in 8 sports as follows:

Medallists

Athletics

Men

Women

Cycling

Men
Time trials & Road races

Pursuits & Sprints

Women
Time trials & Road races

Pursuits & Sprints

Equestrian

Sailing

Men

Shooting

Women

Swimming

Men

Table tennis

Men
Individual

Women

Wheelchair Tennis

Men

See also
2008 Summer Paralympics
Austria at the Paralympics
Austria at the 2008 Summer Olympics

References

External links
Beijing 2008 Paralympic Games Official Site
International Paralympic Committee

Nations at the 2008 Summer Paralympics
2008
Paralympics